Sierpiński's constant is a mathematical constant usually denoted as K. One way of defining it is as the following limit:

where r2(k) is a number of representations of k as a sum of the form a2 + b2 for integer a and b.

It can be given in closed form as:

Another way to define/understand Sierpiński's constant is,

Let r(n) denote the number of representations of  by  squares, then the Summatory Function of   has the Asymptotic expansion

,

where  is the Sierpinski constant. The above plot shows

,

with the value of  indicated as the solid horizontal line.

See also 
 Wacław Sierpiński

External links 
 
 http://www.plouffe.fr/simon/constants/sierpinski.txt - Sierpiński's constant up to 2000th decimal digit.
 
 
https://archive.lib.msu.edu/crcmath/math/math/s/s276.htm

Mathematical constants

References